Kirata Temamaka (modern spelling, Temwamwaka) was a member of the Kiribati House of Assembly for the constituency of Kiritimati.

References

Year of birth missing (living people)
Living people
Members of the House of Assembly (Kiribati)
People from Kiritimati
Pillars of Truth politicians
21st-century I-Kiribati politicians